Schuks! Your Country Needs You is a 2013 South African comedy prank movie directed by Gray Hofmeyr and written by Leon Schuster. The movie is the eighth entry in the popular South African candid camera series where Leon Schuster as the titular Schuks, Rob van Vuuren, Lare Birk, and Alfred Ntombela prank unsuspecting everyday South Africans.

References

External links
 

2013 comedy films
2013 films
Films set in South Africa
South African comedy films